Shoghi railway station is a railway station serving Shoghi town near Shimla, Himachal Pradesh in India. It is on the Kalka–Shimla Railway and under Ambala railway division of Northern Railway zone of Indian Railways.

It is located 1833 metres above sea level and has two platform. As of July 2019, 5 trains a day stop here.

References

Ambala railway division
Railway stations in Shimla district
Mountain railways in India

British-era buildings in Himachal Pradesh